In the mathematical field of differential geometry, a geometric flow, also called a geometric evolution equation, is a type of partial differential equation for a geometric object such as a Riemannian metric or an embedding. It is not a term with a formal meaning, but is typically understood to refer to parabolic partial differential equations.

Certain geometric flows arise as the gradient flow associated to a functional on a manifold which has a geometric interpretation, usually associated with some extrinsic or intrinsic curvature. Such flows are fundamentally related to the calculus of variations, and include mean curvature flow and Yamabe flow.

Examples

Extrinsic
Extrinsic geometric flows are flows on embedded submanifolds, or more generally
immersed submanifolds. In general they change both the Riemannian metric and the immersion.
 Mean curvature flow, as in soap films; critical points are minimal surfaces
 Curve-shortening flow, the one-dimensional case of the mean curvature flow
 Willmore flow, as in minimax eversions of spheres
 Inverse mean curvature flow

Intrinsic
Intrinsic geometric flows are flows on the Riemannian metric, independent of any embedding or immersion.
 Ricci flow, as in the solution of the Poincaré conjecture, and Richard S. Hamilton's proof of the uniformization theorem
 Calabi flow, a flow for Kähler metrics
 Yamabe flow

Classes of flows
Important classes of flows are curvature flows, variational flows (which extremize some functional), and flows arising as solutions to parabolic partial differential equations. A given flow frequently admits all of these interpretations, as follows.

Given an elliptic operator  the parabolic PDE  yields a flow, and stationary states for the flow are solutions to the elliptic partial differential equation 

In the context of geometric flows, the functional is often the  norm norm of some curvature.

Thus, given a curvature  one can define the functional  which has Euler–Lagrange equation  for some elliptic operator  and associated parabolic PDE 

The Ricci flow, Calabi flow, and Yamabe flow arise in this way (in some cases with normalizations).

Curvature flows may or may not preserve volume (the Calabi flow does, while the Ricci flow does not), and if not, the flow may simply shrink or grow the manifold, rather than regularizing the metric. Thus one often normalizes the flow, for instance, by fixing the volume.

See also
 Harmonic map heat flow

References